There's Something Wrong with Aunt Diane is a 2011 documentary television film directed by Liz Garbus about the 2009 Taconic State Parkway crash. It premiered on HBO on July 25, 2011.

Premise
The film profiles Diane Schuler, who caused the fatal car accident, through interviews with her family members and friends, and attempts to piece together Schuler's actions on the day of the accident, in order to determine why the accident took place. The primary interviewees are Schuler's husband, Daniel, and sister-in-law, Jay, who are convinced that the toxicology report showing Schuler's high level of alcohol and THC intoxication was inaccurate, or that Schuler did not knowingly consume the intoxicants.

References

External links
 
 
 There's Something Wrong with Aunt Diane on HBO

2011 documentary films
2011 television films
2011 films
Documentary films about disasters
Films directed by Liz Garbus
HBO documentary films
2010s American films